Maximilian Arnold (born 27 May 1994) is a German professional footballer who plays as a midfielder for Bundesliga club VfL Wolfsburg and the Germany national team.

An academy graduate of Wolfsburg, Arnold became the club's youngest ever debutant in 2011 and has since made over 300 league appearances for the club.

Club career

VfL Wolfsburg

Youth and early Wolfsburg career
Born in Riesa, Germany, Arnold represented local sides BSV Strehla and SC Riesa during his formative years. In 2006, at the age of 12, he left Riesa to join the academy of Dynamo Dresden where he spent the next four years before signing for VfL Wolfsburg. During his time with Wolfsburg's youth sides he helped the club to two German U-19 championships; in 2009 and 2011.

Arnold was handed his first-team debut by Felix Magath on 26 November 2011 when he was brought on as a late substitute in a 2–0 loss at FC Augsburg. Upon appearing he became the club's youngest ever debutant at the age of 17 years, five months and 30 days. He spent the majority of the season with the U-19 side, however, and made only one further senior appearance for the remainder of the campaign.

After continuing to impress at youth level, Arnold returned to the first team in 2013 under new manager Dieter Hecking. On 13 April, he scored his first professional goal in a 2–2 home draw against 1899 Hoffenheim. In doing so, he also became the club's youngest ever goalscorer. He scored again the following week in a 3–0 victory over Werder Bremen which helped end a streak of five matches without a win for Wolfsburg. Following a run of two goals in six matches, Arnold signed an extended four-year contract with the club.

First team breakthrough and Cup success

The following season, Arnold started in the opening match against Hannover but was sent off after just thirty minutes. He subsequently lost his place in the side's squad and had to wait a number of months before returning. Upon his return, however, he scored four goals in five matches to help the club qualify for the following season's Europa League. His form throughout the season caught the attention of German national team manager Joachim Löw who handed him his first senior call-up at the end of the campaign. He carried his form into the 2014–15 season where Wolfsburg ended as runners-up to Bayern Munich and won the DFB Pokal after beating Borussia Dortmund 3–1.

By virtue of the club's league position the season before and success in the DFB Pokal, Wolfsburg took part in the 2015 DFL-Supercup and the 2015–16 UEFA Champions League campaign. On 1 August 2015, Arnold started and played the whole match as Wolfsburg beat Bayern Munich on penalties to claim the Supercup title. He then made his Champions League debut on 15 September 2015, coming as a substitute for André Schürrle in a 1–0 win over CSKA Moscow. He scored his first goal in the competition in April the following year, netting Wolfsburg's second in a 2–0 home win over Real Madrid in the quarter-finals. Wolfsburg failed to progress, however, as a hat-trick from Madrid's Cristiano Ronaldo in the second leg saw the club eliminated from the competition. Arnold ultimately scored four goals in 43 appearances across all competitions as Wolfsburg ended the league campaign in eighth position.

The club struggled during the course of the next two seasons. During the 2016–17 campaign, Arnold scored twice, including one against Hoffenheim in the first match of the Rückrunde as Wolfsburg narrowly avoided relegation. Wolfsburg ultimately had to defeat Eintracht Braunschweig in the relegation play-off to maintain their spot in the German top-flight. The club again battled relegation the following season and towards the end of the campaign, Arnold and teammates Max Grün and Paul Verhaegh had to try and appease the club's disgruntled supporters following a 3–1 defeat to fellow relegation strugglers, Hamburg. In spite of the club's shortcomings, Arnold had enjoyed some personal success earlier in the season. On 3 January 2018, he signed a new five-year contract with Wolfsburg and later that month scored a contender for goal of the season with a long-range free-kick in a 3–1 defeat to Eintracht Frankfurt.

On 23 November 2019, Arnold made his 200th Bundesliga appearance for Wolfsburg and marked the occasion with an assist for Wout Weghorst's goal in the club's 2–0 win over Eintracht Frankfurt.

International career

Youth
Between 2009 and 2017, Arnold represented Germany at every youth level. In 2017, he captained the U-21 side to the title at the 2017 UEFA European Under-21 Championship in Poland. He recorded two assists, and scored his spot-kick in a penalty shootout win over England in the semi-finals, as Germany went on to claim their second title with a victory over Spain. His performances throughout the tournament ultimately earned him a spot in the team of the tournament.

Arnold was named as one of the three permitted overage players in Germany's squad for the 2020 Olympics in Tokyo, eventually being selected as captain. Arnold would be sent off in the opening match of the tournament, a 4-2 defeat against Brazil.

Senior
On 13 May 2014, Arnold made his debut against Poland, though he played only the last 14 minutes after substituting Max Meyer.

Career statistics

Club

Honours
VfL Wolfsburg
DFB-Pokal: 2014–15
DFL-Supercup: 2015

Germany U21
UEFA European Under-21 Championship: 2017

Individual
UEFA European Under-21 Championship Team of the Tournament: 2017

References

External links

Profile at the VfL Wolfsburg website

kicker profile 

1994 births
Living people
People from Riesa
Footballers from Saxony
German footballers
Germany youth international footballers
Germany under-21 international footballers
Olympic footballers of Germany
Germany international footballers
Association football midfielders
Bundesliga players
VfL Wolfsburg players
VfL Wolfsburg II players
Footballers at the 2020 Summer Olympics